Sir Francis Hamilton, 3rd Baronet (c.1640 – 4 February 1714) was an Anglo-Irish politician. 

Hamilton was the son of Sir Charles Hamilton, 2nd Baronet, of Castle Hamilton and in 1689 he succeeded to his father's baronetcy. He was the Member of Parliament for Cavan County in the Irish House of Commons between 1661 and 1666, before representing the seat again from 1692 until his death in 1714. Upon his death, his title became either extinct or dormant.

References

17th-century births
1714 deaths
17th-century Anglo-Irish people
18th-century Anglo-Irish people
Baronets in the Baronetage of Nova Scotia
Irish MPs 1661–1666
Irish MPs 1692–1693
Irish MPs 1695–1699
Irish MPs 1703–1713
Irish MPs 1713–1714
Members of the Parliament of Ireland (pre-1801) for County Cavan constituencies